Mill Creek is a stream in the U.S. state of Michigan. It is a tributary to the Paw Paw River.

Mill Creek was named for the sawmills along its course.

References

Rivers of Berrien County, Michigan
Rivers of Van Buren County, Michigan
Rivers of Michigan